Two Swords may refer to:

 "Two Swords", a song from The Beat 1980 album I Just Can't Stop It
 "Two Swords" (Game of Thrones), a 2014 episode of the HBO series Game of Thrones
 "Two Swords", a 2017 episode of the animated series Adventure Time
 Doctrine of the two swords
 "two swords" of Luke 22:38
 Grunwald Swords
 Hands of Victory, a monument in Baghdad
 Hyōhō Niten Ichi-ryū, Japanese style of swordsmanship

See also
 Madame Tussauds